Queen of the South is an American crime drama television series developed by M.A. Fortin and Joshua John Miller. The series premiered on June 23, 2016, and concluded on June 9, 2021, with 62 episodes aired on USA Network. It is an adaptation of the telenovela La Reina del Sur which airs on USA's sister network Telemundo; both are adapted from the novel La Reina del Sur by Spanish author Arturo Pérez-Reverte. The series was renewed for a fifth season on August 29, 2019. Production of the new season was suspended indefinitely on March 14, 2020, due to COVID-19, but resumed in fall 2020. On March 8, 2021, it was announced that the fifth season would premiere on April 7, 2021, and serve as the series' final season.

Plotline
Queen of the South is an adaptation of the telenovela La Reina del Sur, which is itself an adaptation of the novel of the same name by Spanish author Arturo Pérez-Reverte. The series centers around Teresa Mendoza, a poor Mexican woman who becomes wealthy by building a vast drug empire.

Teresa lives in the barrio of Culiacán in Sinaloa, Mexico. She falls in love with a member of a drug cartel, and tries to rise above her life's impoverished condition. After she is told her boyfriend has been murdered, she is forced to flee. She crosses the border to the United States where she ends up in the criminal organization of the wife of the cartel boss who is after her.
Teresa has a different vision of the drug distribution business and due to her charisma attracts associates and ends up starting her own drug distributing organization. Teresa becomes very successful, which presents her with more problems, makes her endure sacrifices and attracts the attention of covert government forces.

Cast and characters

Main
 Alice Braga as Teresa Mendoza, a poor woman from Sinaloa, Mexico, who becomes wealthy by building a vast drug empire.
 Peter Gadiot as James Valdez (seasons 1–3, 5; guest season 4), Camila's right-hand man and Teresa's mentor, friend, partner, and lover
 Veronica Falcón as Doña Camila Vargas (seasons 1–3), Don Epifanio's estranged wife and head of the North American branch of the Vargas Cartel in Dallas, Texas.
 Hemky Madera as Pote Galvez, a former Vargas Cartel lieutenant who has since become one of Teresa Mendoza's strongest allies. Kelly Anne's boyfriend
 Joaquim de Almeida as Don Epifanio Vargas, Camila Vargas's husband (seasons 1–2, guest season 3), head of the Vargas Cartel (see: Sinaloa Cartel), and a candidate for the governor of the Mexican state of Sinaloa.
 Justina Machado as Brenda Parra (season 1, guest season 4), the wife of a high-ranking transporter for the Vargas Cartel, and Teresa's best friend when the series begins.
 Molly Burnett as Kelly Anne Van Awken (season 5; recurring seasons 2–4), a Dallas socialite who becomes Teresa's lawyer and part of her inner circle. Pote's girlfriend
 Gerardo Taracena as Cesar "Batman" Guemes (seasons 1–2), Don Epifanio Vargas's right-hand man
 Jon-Michael Ecker as Raymundo "Güero" Dávila (season 2, recurring season 1, guest season 3–4), Teresa's first boyfriend and a drug dealer
 Nick Sagar as DEA agent Alonzo Loya (seasons 2–3).
 Yancey Arias as Alberto Cortez, a corrupt army Colonel (season 3; recurring season 2).
 Alfonso Herrera as Javier Jiménez, Boaz's cousin (season 4, recurring season 3), a member of the Jiménez cartel and a mercenary willing to kill for the highest bidder.
 David Andrews as Judge Cecil Lafayette (season 4, recurring season 5), a corrupt judge who makes things harder for Teresa's drug operation in New Orleans<ref>{{cite web|url=https://www.usanetwork.com/queenofthesouth/cast/judge-cecil-lafayette|title=David Andrews plays Judge Cecil Lafayette - Cast & Crew - Queen of the South|work=USA Network}}</ref>

Recurring
 Joseph T. Campos as Boaz Jiménez, a former cartel leader (and Javier's cousin) who later runs Teresa's operations in Sinaloa and Miami.
 Ryan O'Nan as King George (seasons 2–5), a smuggler who helps Teresa build her empire.
 Idalia Valles as Isabela Vargas (seasons 1–3), the daughter of Camila and Epifanio Vargas.
 Jamie Hector as Devon Finch (seasons 2–3, 5), CIA contractor posing as a drug dealer.
 Snow Tha Product (season 2–3) as Little T, a gang member whom Teresa engages to protect Camila in prison and who later becomes a trusted member of her inner circle.
 Iba Thiam as Bilal (season 2–3), King George's right-hand man
 Mark Consuelos as Teo Aljarafe (seasons 1–2), the first lawyer Camila Vargas employs while setting in motion her plan for independence.
 Bret Cullen as Cole Van Awken (season 2), Kelly Anne's husband, Camila's lover and lawyer. He is instrumental in forging documents that lead to the fallout between Camila and Teresa.
 Martha Higareda as Castel Fioto (season 2, 3, guest season 4), Teresa's Colombian supplier, who has friendly ties with the CIA.
 Joe Renteria as Reynaldo Fioto, (season 2–3), the Colombian supplier of the Vargas family, who gets killed by his niece Castel.
 John Pyper Ferguson as Agent Finnerman (season 2), DEA Agent trying to turn Teresa against Camila.
 Blair Bomer as Kim Brown (season 1), James's ex-girlfriend.
 Michel Duval as Enrique "Kique" Jiménez (season 2–3), son of Boaz Jimenez, and later fiancé of Isabela Vargas.
 Felipe Barrientos as The Charger, Camila Vargas's gang master, who later becomes a close member of Teresa's inner circle. 
 Pete Partida as Tonto (season 1, 2, 3), a sicario working for Camila and James.
 Adolfo Alvarez as Tony Parra (seasons 1–2), Brenda's son and Teresa's godson. 
 Julio César Cedillo as Manuel Jiménez (season 1–2), Boaz's brother, head of the Jiménez cartel and competitor to the Vargas cartel.
 Gustavo Hernández as Pedro Jiménez (season 2), Kique's cousin who kidnaps Isabela Vargas.
 James Martínez as Gato Fierros (season 1), a lieutenant in the Vargas Cartel
Paola Andino as Olivia Gutiérrez (season 2), a close friend of Isabela Vargas since their childhood. She introduces Isabela into the drug-fueled party lifestyle of a "narco-brat".
 Electra Avelan as Leo (season 2), Güero's ex-girlfriend
 Armando Riesco as Pecas (season 3), the narco boss of La Comisión, a group trafficking in Arizona.
 Zahn McClarnon (season 3), as Taza, a member of La Comisión, who puts his trust in Teresa.
 A. Martínez as Sheriff Jed Mayo (season 3), a corrupt sheriff in Phoenix whom Teresa and James are forced to work with.
 Abel Becerra as Bedoya (season 3), a member of La Comisión, who Teresa and James use as bait.
 Dominique Burgess as Ivan (season 3), Teresa's IT specialist.
 Maruis Biegai as Oleg Stavinsky (season 3, 5), an associate of Teresa from Europe.
 Alimi Ballard as Marcel Dumas (seasons 4–5), a slick and measured Creole leader of a New Orleans street gang, and owner of a hip jazz club.
 Lance E. Nichols as Lucien (season 4–5), Marcel's godfather, an important figure in the NOLA crime scene.
 Vera Cherny as Oksana Volkova (seasons 4–5), a Russian drug dealer based in Atlanta who partners with Teresa and El Gordo. Kostya's cousin and Samara's mother.
 Chris Greene as Bobby Leroux (season 4), Marcel Dumas's right-hand man
 Pêpê Rapazote as Raul 'El Gordo' Rodriguez (season 4), a Cuban drug dealer based in Miami who partners with Teresa and Oksana.
 Christopher Márquez as Elias (season 4), El Gordo's nephew and right-hand man
 Bailey Chase as Eddie Brucks (season 4), a musician attempting to overcome his personal demons who crosses paths with Teresa.
 Chelsea Tavares as Birdie (season 4), a New Orleans mixology whiz who works at Teresa's bar.
 Sofía Lama as Emilia (season 4), Javier's girlfriend and Boaz's ex-fiancé.
 David Bianchi as Manny (season 4), one of Teresa's New Orleans soldiers.
 Alejandro Barrios as Chicho (seasons 4–5), one of Teresa's New Orleans soldiers and later, Kelly Anne's bodyguard
 Julian Silva as Tony Parra (season 4), Brenda's son and Teresa's godson. 
 Cory Hart as Detective Randall Greene (season 4), a corrupt New Orleans cop who is Judge Lafayette's right-hand man
 Derek Evans as Davis Lafayette (season 4), Judge Lafayette's emotionally fragile son.
 Donald Paul as Cedric (seasons 4–5), the savvy and sly hit man gangster working for Marcel Dumas and sometimes for the Queen
 Manuel Ramirez as Angel Jimenez (season 5), Boaz's cousin.
 Antonio Haramillo as Osvaldo Ruiz (season 5), Boaz's friend in charge of the Sinaloa operation.
 Pasha Lychnikoff as Kostya, a Russian mafia boss hiding as a Russian diplomat in the U.S. and Oksana's cousin (season 5)
 Eve Harlow as Samara Volkova, (season 5), Oksana's daughter.

Guest
 Rafael Amaya as Aurelio Casillas (seasons 1–2), a drug lord
 Remy Ma as Vee, one of Devon Finch's soldiers (season 3) 
 MC Lyte as Devon Finch's sister, the Professor (seasons 2–3)
 Steven Bauer as El Santo (season 2–3), a crazy coke producer from Bolivia who runs a sect and in whose family Teresa ingratiates herself. 
 Naturi Naughton as Sasha Bishop (season 3)
 Jordi Molla as Rocco de la Pena (season 3), a banker with whom Teresa does business in Malta.
 Claudia Ferri as La Capitana (season 3), a military captain chasing El Santo. She makes Teresa's trip to Bolivia extremely dangerous.
 Elvis Nolasco as Oscar Polanko (season 5), a Dominican drug dealer in NYC with whom Teresa forges an alliance.
 Moses J. Moseley as Tic Tok, one of Marcel Dumas's soldiers (season 4)
 Nikki Dixon as DEA Agent Valerie Postak.
 West Liang as Billy Lin (season 3), Devon Finch's right-hand man
 Wallace Carranza as Barbaro (season 1) General of the Vargas Cartel under Camila Vargas.
 Ximena Duque as Eva Buemeros (season 2), Epifanio's smart and ambitious young assistant
 Jason Vendryes as Spears, one of Devon Finch's henchmen (season 5)

Episodes

Reception
Critical responseQueen of the South first season received mixed to positive feedback from critics. On Rotten Tomatoes, it has a score of 68%, based on 19 reviews, with an average rating of 6.18/10. The site's consensus reads: "Queen of the South enlivens an overdone premise with action and narrative vigor—and shows hints of intriguing potential." On Metacritic, the first season scored 59 out of 100, based on 16 critics, indicating "mixed or average reviews".

Ratings

Awards and nominations

Broadcast
Internationally, the series premiered in Australia on Showcase on August 4, 2016. German TV channel DMAX has been showing the series since June 14, 2017.

The series is also available on Netflix. Netflix owns First Run rights to the show.

 Inspiration 
Pérez-Reverte, author of the novel,  has stated that a great source of inspiration was Mexican narcocorridos'' (drug ballads), country-polka songs that tell the stories about real life Mexican drug lords.

One of the real-life characters who inspired the novel is Sandra Ávila Beltrán, known as the "Queen of the Pacific", famous for being one of the first female drug traffickers to reach the level of "boss" in the Mexican cartels, a place usually reserved for men.

References

Notes

External links
 
 

2010s American crime drama television series
2021 American television series endings
2016 American television series debuts
American action television series
American television series based on telenovelas
American thriller television series
English-language television shows
Serial drama television series
Television series by 20th Century Fox Television
Television series by Universal Content Productions
Television shows filmed in Texas
Television shows set in Costa Rica
Television shows set in Dallas
Television shows set in Spain
USA Network original programming
Works about Mexican drug cartels